Laurel Arnell-Cullen, better known as Laurel, is a British indie musician based in London. Laurel received critical acclaim for writing, recording and producing all her music in her bedroom studio in London.

Career
Laurel first caught interest from music bloggers in 2013 when she posted a demo for her song "Next time". Laurel released "Fire Breather" as her first official single, via her SoundCloud the same year. Laurel released her debut EP, To The Hills, in 2014 via her own record label, Next Time Records. In July 2015, Laurel released a finished version of her song "Blue Blood" which, in demo form had gained much attention with online blogs. 

In March 2016, Laurel released "Life Worth Living" which, would be the first track of her debut album released 3 years later. Unlike her previous work, it featured a strong indie rock influence with a leading electric guitar. In May 2016, she then dropped a second single titled "San Francisco". This single earned her the place of Apple Music's first Artist of the Week. In August 2016, Laurel announced she had signed to Counter Records, a division of Ninja Tune Records and that she would be going on her first headline UK tour in November, in support of her EP, Park. "Hurricane" was released as the first single from Park in September 2016 and gained a lot of buzz from music bloggers and indie radio stations.

In August of 2020, Laurel released “Scream Drive Faster” from her EP entitled “Petrol Bloom.” This represented a significant change in her musical style towards that of synthpop and synthwave, with more of a retro synth-based sound on her tracks, often similar to that of the 80s. She followed this up with “Best I Ever Had” in October of 2020 and “Appetite” in December of 2020, which is currently her most-viewed video on YouTube.

In spring of 2021, Laurel released another EP entitled “Limbo Cherry” from which she released the singles “You’re the One”, “Let Go” and “Wild Side”

Discography

Studio albums

Extended plays

Mixtapes

Singles

References

British pop musicians
Living people
1994 births
Counter Records artists